Mustafa Sait Yazıcıoğlu (born 1949 in Sürmene, Turkey) is a minister of state of Turkey. He is a professor of religious studies.

Family, education and scientific career 
Yazıcıoğlu went to Grammar School and High School in Milas in Western Turkey. From 1967 to 1971 he studied Islamic theology at Ankara University. To obtain a Ph.D. equivalent the Department for Education sent him to France. Subsequently he came back to Ankara University as an assistant. He attained the post of a professor in 1988.

Family 
Mustafa Sait Yazıcıoğlu is married and father of two children. His brother Recep Yazıcıoğlu (died September 8, 2003) was the governor of Denizli and popular nationwide as "super governor" (Süper Vali).

Political career 
Yazıcıoğlu was assigned head of the Presidency of Religious Affairs 1987–1992. In 2002 Yazıcıoğlu was elected to the parliament for AKP. In the ministry of Erdoğan he was first responsible for religious affairs.

References
 Who is Who – Prof. Dr. Mustafa Sait Yazıcıoğlu 

Government ministers of Turkey
1949 births
Living people
Justice and Development Party (Turkey) politicians
Members of the 23rd Parliament of Turkey
Members of the 22nd Parliament of Turkey
Presidents of Religious Affairs of Turkey
Ministers of State of Turkey
Members of the 60th government of Turkey